Lasse Sobiech (born 18 January 1991) is a German professional footballer who plays as a central defender for South African club Stellenbosch.

Club career
In March 2018, it was reported Sobiech would join 1. FC Köln from FC St. Pauli for the next season having agreed a three-year contract. In January 2020, Sobiech was loaned to Royal Excel Mouscron for the remainder of the season.

On 4 September 2020, it was announced that Sobiech would join Swiss side FC Zürich on a one-year loan deal. In July 2021, after the end of his loan deal, the club announced that Sobiech's contract had been terminated and that he would join SV Darmstadt 98.

On 6 July 2022, Sobiech joined Stellenbosch in South Africa.

International career
Sobiech was born in Germany, his family origins from Silesia and Poland. He is a youth international for Germany at various levels.

Career statistics

References

External links
 
 

1991 births
Living people
People from Schwerte
Sportspeople from Arnsberg (region)
Footballers from North Rhine-Westphalia
German people of Polish descent
German footballers
Association football defenders
Germany youth international footballers
Germany under-21 international footballers
Bundesliga players
2. Bundesliga players
3. Liga players
Regionalliga players
Belgian Pro League players
Swiss Super League players
Borussia Dortmund II players
Borussia Dortmund players
FC St. Pauli players
SpVgg Greuther Fürth players
Hamburger SV players
1. FC Köln players
 Royal Excel Mouscron players
FC Zürich players
SV Darmstadt 98 players
Stellenbosch F.C. players
German expatriate sportspeople in Belgium
Expatriate footballers in Belgium
German expatriate sportspeople in Switzerland
Expatriate footballers in Switzerland
German expatriate sportspeople in South Africa
Expatriate soccer players in South Africa